Sybrocentrura is a genus of longhorn beetles of the subfamily Lamiinae, containing the following species:

 Sybrocentrura obscura Breuning, 1947
 Sybrocentrura procerior Holzschuh, 2010
 Sybrocentrura ropicoides (Gressitt, 1939)

References

Desmiphorini